Salvador Litvak is a Chilean-American filmmaker and social media influencer. He has written and directed two theatrically-released feature films, When Do We Eat? (2006) and Saving Lincoln (2013). As the Accidental Talmudist, Litvak shares Jewish wisdom with over one million followers on his Facebook page and hosts AT Daily, a Talmud study show on Facebook Live and YouTube.

Early life and education 
Litvak was born in Santiago, Chile in 1965 and came to the United States at the age of five. He grew up in Riverdale and New City, New York. He majored in English at Harvard, where he rowed on the heavyweight crew team. He then moved on to NYU Law School, earned his Juris Doctor degree, and passed the New York State Bar Exam.

While attending law school, Litvak mounted a series of multimedia performance art pieces in Greenwich Village. After finishing law school, he took a job as a mergers and acquisitions lawyer at Skadden Arps while continuing his writing. After two years, he left the practice of law to enroll in the graduate Directors' Program at the UCLA School of Theater, Film & Television, where he earned a Master of Fine Arts degree.

Career 
Litvak formed a production company, Pictures From the Fringe. With his wife Nina Davidovich, Litvak wrote When Do We Eat?, a comedic Passover film about a dysfunctional Jewish family celebrating "the world's fastest seder." Litvak directed the film and partnered with executive producer Horatio Kemeny to make When Do We Eat? independently. The film's ensemble cast includes Lesley Ann Warren, Michael Lerner, Max Greenfield, Shiri Appleby, Ben Feldman and Jack Klugman in his final film role. When Do We Eat? was released theatrically by THINKFilm in 34 cities in 2006.

Litvak followed it up with Saving Lincoln in 2013, based on the true story of Abraham Lincoln and his self-appointed bodyguard, Ward Hill Lamon. Saving Lincoln features a visual style invented by Litvak named CineCollage, in which live action elements are inserted into 3D environments composited from vintage photographs. Litvak raised post-production funds on Kickstarter. He contributed an essay to the Abraham Lincoln Presidential Library's book Gettysburg Replies.

In 2012, Litvak finished reading the entire Talmud after participating in the 7.5 year Daf Yomi cycle. Wanting to share the wisdom he learned, Litvak started a blog and a Facebook page called Accidental Talmudist. Together with his wife Nina, Litvak shares Jewish wisdom, faith, culture, history and music with over a million followers. Litvak also edits the Table For Five column for The Jewish Journal of Greater Los Angeles in which in five writers comment on a verse from the weekly Torah portion. In 2019, Litvak partnered with the Jewish Journal to launch The Accidental Talmudist Podcast.

References

External links 
 
 Official Saving Lincoln Website
 Official When Do We Eat? Website
 The seven-year cycle by Salvador Litvak
 Talking Pictures: Salvador Litvak from When Do We Eat 
 About Salvador Litvak, from Jewish Journal
 'Saving Lincoln' is the Newest Movie in 2012's Crush of Films About the 16th President

1965 births
Living people
People from Santiago
Chilean people of Hungarian-Jewish descent
Chilean people of Lithuanian-Jewish descent
Chilean Jews
American film directors
UCLA Film School alumni
Harvard University alumni
Skadden, Arps, Slate, Meagher & Flom people
New York University School of Law alumni